Inachus or Inachos (Greek: Ίναχος) is:

 Inachos, a former municipality in Greece, Aetolia-Acarnania Regional Unit
 Inachos, a village in Greece, Argolis Regional Unit
 Inachos, a river flowing into the Aegean Sea
 Inachus, a king of Argos and personification of the same named river
 Inachos, a river flowing into the river Achelous
 Inachus, a genus of crabs